Mob Wives: The Sit Down is an American half-hour post-show that follows after season two episodes of Mob Wives, first broadcast on VH1 on January 29, 2012. The series is hosted by Carrie Keagan.

Each episode has 2-3 of the cast members, along with a celebrity guest, who discuss the events that unfolded during the episode that aired the hour before. The cast members share behind-the-scenes information or clips. The series ran for only seven episodes.

Episodes

References

2010s American reality television series
2012 American television series debuts
2012 American television series endings
English-language television shows
VH1 original programming
Television series by The Weinstein Company